Events in the year 2022 in Cambodia.

Incumbents

Events 
Ongoing — COVID-19 pandemic in Cambodia

 14 January - Cambodia begins administering fourth doses of the COVID-19 vaccine for high-risk groups, including healthcare workers, government ministers, and members of the armed forces.
 23 February - Cambodia begins its COVID-19 vaccination rollout for children over the age of three years, becoming the world's first country to administer vaccines for children under the age of five years.
 7 June - Cambodia and China break ground on a joint expansion project of the Ream Naval Base near Sihanoukville.
 14 June - A Cambodian court convicts 60 members of the former Cambodia National Rescue Party of treason, including Cambodian-American lawyer Theary Seng.
 28 December - A fire in the Grand Diamond City casino hotel in Poipet, Banteay Meanchey province, kills over 25 people and injures dozens more.

Deaths 

 11 January - Magawa, African giant pouched rat (b. 2013)
 22 March - Thiounn Mumm, civil servant (b. 1925)

References 

 

 
Cambodia
Cambodia
2020s in Cambodia
Years of the 21st century in Cambodia